Axel Landing Larsen known as Buster Larsen (1 September 1920 – 18 December 1993), was a Danish stage, film and TV actor. He had his stage debut on Nørrebros Theater in 1932 aged 12, and his film debut in 1933.

Filmography 

 De blaa drenge – 1933
 Frøken Kirkemus – 1941
  – 1943
  – 1943
  – 1944
  – 1944
 Den usynlige hær – 1945
  – 1946
 Når katten er ude – 1947
  – 1948
  – 1949
  – 1949
 Fodboldpræsten – 1951
 Rekrut 67 Petersen – 1952
 Ved Kongelunden – 1953
 I kongens klær – 1954
  – 1955
 Det var på Rundetårn – 1955
 Hvad vil De ha'? – 1956
 Færgekroen – 1956
 Hidden Fear – 1957
 Tag til marked i Fjordby – 1957
 Lån mig din kone – 1957
 Pigen og vandpytten – 1958
  – 1959
 Vi er allesammen tossede – 1959
 Cirkus Buster – 1961
 Duellen – 1962
 Den kære familie – 1962
 Don Olsen kommer til byen – 1963
  – 1963
  – 1964
 The Reluctant Sadist – 1967
  – 1968
  – 1969
  – 1969
 Med kærlig hilsen – 1971
  – 1971
  – 1971
  – 1976
 Olsen-banden ser rødt – 1976
  – 1977
  – 1979
 Attentat – 1980
 Jeppe på bjerget – 1981
  – 1982
  – 1983
 Midt om natten – 1984
 Busters verden – 1984
 Pelle Erobreren – 1987
  – 1989
 Krummerne – 1991
  – 1992

References

Further reading

External links 
 
 

1920 births
1993 deaths
Danish male comedians
Danish male film actors
Danish male television actors
Best Actor Bodil Award winners
Male actors from Copenhagen
20th-century Danish male actors
20th-century comedians
Burials at the Garrison Cemetery, Copenhagen